"(Welcome) New Lovers" is a 1960 song written by Charles Singleton and recorded in 1959 by American actor and singer Pat Boone. It reached No. 18 on the Billboard Hot 100.

Background 
It is a rockaballad.

Track listing

Chart performance

References

1960 singles
1960 songs
Pat Boone songs
Dot Records singles
Songs written by Charles Singleton (songwriter)